Chula Vista High School (CVHS) is a public high school located in Chula Vista, California. Founded in 1947, it is part of the Sweetwater Union High School District.

History
Chula Vista first opened in the summer of 1947, operating out of a temporary campus in Brown Field Municipal Airport with an estimated student enrollment of 650. By 1949, the student body had grown to just over 900 students between grades 10, 11, and 12; a new school at the intersection of Fourth Avenue and K Street was under construction. A 2006 referendum enabled existing facilities on Fourth Street to become more environmentally friendly; a new performing arts center was also built as a result.

Athletics
The school's athletic teams are nicknamed the Spartans and compete in the Metropolitan Conference.

Performing arts
CVHS has a competitive show choir, "Main Attraction", and previously fielded the all-female group "Dreamgirls". The program also hosts an annual competition, billed the "SoCal Show Choir Invitational".

Notable alumni
 Billy Casper (1950), golfer
 Tim Danielson, runner
 Grey DeLisle (1991), voice actress
 Donnie Edwards (1991), football player
 Lee Kohse (1992), artist
 Mario Lopez (1991), actor and game show host
 Ray Schmautz, football player
 J. Michael Straczynski, writer/producer, 1972.
 Ty Wigginton, professional baseball player, 1995

References

External links
 
 Chula Vista Master School Index 
 The Chula Vista School for the Creative and Performing Arts

Educational institutions established in 1947
High schools in San Diego County, California
Public high schools in California
Education in Chula Vista, California
1947 establishments in California